Visiana is a genus of moths in the family Geometridae described by Charles Swinhoe in 1900.

Species
Visiana fuscata Schmidt, 2009 northern India (Khasis)
Visiana inimica (Prout, 1937) Bali, Java
Visiana brujata (Guenée, 1857) Australia
Visiana excentrata (Guenée, 1857) Australia

References

Xanthorhoini